The small frog is a species of frog in the family Hylidae endemic to Australia.

Small frog may also refer to:

 Palebrown small frog, a frog native to Bangladesh, India, Myanmar, and Thailand
 Small dainty frog, a frog found in Eswatini, Lesotho and South Africa
 Small disked frog, a frog endemic to the Philippines
 Small torrent frog, a frog found in the Western Ghats of India

See also

 Small treefrog (disambiguation)
 Small-headed frog

Animal common name disambiguation pages